James Dredge may refer to:

James Dredge (minister) (1796–1846), Wesleyan Methodist local preacher, Assistant Protector of Aborigines at Port Phillip
James Dredge Sr. (1794–1863), English engineer and architect, designer of suspension bridges
James Dredge Jr. (1840–1906), English engineer, son of the senior, writer on engineering